The 2022–23 Samford Bulldogs men's basketball team represents Samford University in the 2022–23 NCAA Division I men's basketball season. The Bulldogs, led by third-year head coach Bucky McMillan, play their home games at the Pete Hanna Center in Homewood, Alabama as a member of the Southern Conference.

Previous season
The Bulldogs finished the 2021–22 season 21–11, 10–8 in SoCon play to finish in a tie for third place. As the No. 3 seed in the SoCon tournament, they defeated UNC Greensboro, before losing to Furman in the semifinals.

Roster

Schedule and results

|-
!colspan=12 style=| Non-conference regular season

|-
!colspan=12 style=| SoCon regular season

|-
!colspan=9 style=| SoCon tournament

Sources

References

Samford Bulldogs men's basketball seasons
Samford Bulldogs
Samford Bulldogs men's basketball
Samford Bulldogs men's basketball